Mappilassery Chavara Josephine (3 August 1948 – 10 April 2022) was an Indian activist and politician. She served as the Chairperson of Kerala Women's Commission from 25 May 2017 to 25 June 2021. She was a central committee member of the CPI(M) and she was the candidate of CPI(M) for the 2006 Kerala Legislative Assembly election from the former Mattancherry constituency. Josephine died from a heart attack on 10 April 2022, at the age of 73.

References

1950s births
2022 deaths
21st-century Indian politicians
21st-century Indian women politicians
Year of birth missing
Communist Party of India (Marxist) politicians from Kerala
Malayali politicians
Activists from Kerala
Indian women activists
Politicians from Kochi
People from Mattancherry